The Russian Championship XVII was the seventeenth season of the Russian Championship league, the major rugby league tournament for semi-professional clubs in Russia, taking place in 2007. Eight teams from across Russia took part in the competition. The league is governed by the Russian Rugby League Federation.

Format

Round Robin Stage

Teams play each other once at home, and then once away.

Play-Off Stage

The teams finishing 1st and 2nd during the Round Robin Stage, play until they earn two victories for the 1st place. Also the teams finishing 3rd and 4th during the Round Stage, play until they earn two victories for the 3rd place.

Teams 

 Lokomotiv Moscow
 Kazan Arrows
 Vereya Bears
 Energy Kazan
 Cosmos Krasnoznamensk
 Crystal Rostov
 Neva St.Petersburg
 Empire Penza

Round-robin results

Round 1: (Weekend of 21 and 22 April): 
Arrows – Neva St.Petersburg 30–0 
Vereya – Crystal 108–0 
Empire – Cosmos 64–6

Round 2: (Weekend of 28 and 29 April): 
Locomotive – Arrows 40–10 
Cosmos – Energy 25–30 
Crystal – Empire 24–46 
Neva St.Petersburg – Vereya 0–78

Round 3: (Weekend of 5 and 6 May): 
Empire – Neva St.Petersburg 64–2 
Energy – Crystal 30–0 
Vereya – Locomotive 17–32

Round 4: (Weekend of 12 and 13 May): 
Arrows – Vereya 12–12 
Empire – Locomotive 6–56 
Neva St.Petersburg – Energy 32–40

Round 5: (Weekend of 19 and 20 May): 
Empire – Arrows 22–14 
Energy – Locomotive 12–54 
Cosmos – Crystal 56–18

Round 6: (Weekend of 2 and 3 June): 
Neva St.Petersburg – Cosmos 30–6 
Arrows – Energy 24–20 
Vereya – Empire 36–2

Round 7: (Weekend of 9 and 10 June): 
Energy – Vereya 10–64 
Cosmos – Locomotive 3–104 
Crystal – Neva St.Petersburg 68–18

Round 8: (Weekend of 16 and 17 June): 
Crystal – Arrows 0–30 
Cosmos – Vereya 1–112 
Neva St.Petersburg – Locomotive 6–40

Round 9: (Weekend of 23 and 24 June): 
Empire – Energy 32–14 
Locomotive – Crystal 58–4 
Arrows – Cosmos 60–16

Round 10: (Weekend of 21 and 22 July): 
Neva St.Petersburg – Arrows 4–52 
Crystal – Vereya 10–74 
Cosmos – Empire 17– 59

Round 11: (Weekend of 28 and 29 July): 
Arrows – Locomotive 4–24 
Vereya – Neva St.Petersburg 84–12 
Energy – Cosmos 46–6 
Empire – Crystal 30–0

Round 12: (Weekend of 4 and 5 August): 
Locomotive – Vereya 40–6 
Neva St.Petersburg – Empire 6–76 
Crystal – Energy 0–30

Round 13: (Weekend of 11 and 12 August): 
Vereya – Arrows 56–12 
Locomotive – Empire 72–20 
Energy – Neva St.Petersburg 124–4

Round 14: (Weekend of 18 and 19 August): 
Locomotive – Energy 108–5 
Arrows – Empire 14–15 
Crystal – Cosmos 54–8

Round 15: (Weekend of 1 and 2 September): 
Empire – Vereya 23–40 
Cosmos – Neva St.Petersburg 52–10 
Energy – Arrows 12–36

Round 16: (Weekend of 8 and 9 September): 
Locomotive – Cosmos 98–3 
Vereya – Energy 74–5 
Neva St.Petersburg – Crystal 22–34

Round 17: (Weekend of 15 and 16 September): 
Locomotive – Neva St.Petersburg 30–0 
Vereya – Cosmos 112–4 
Arrows – Crystal 30–0

Round 18: (Weekend of 22 and 23 September): 
Energy – Empire 14–26 
Crystal – Locomotive 0–64 
Cosmos – Arrows 23–40

Table

Points System 
3 Points – Win
2 Points – Draw
1 Point  – Loss
0 Points – Forfeit

Play-Off Results 

Week One

Matches played on 29 September.

Lokomotive Moscow 58–14 Vereya (1st v 2nd)
Empire Penza 21–16 Kazan Arrows (3rd v 4th)

Week Two

Matches played on 4 October.

Vereya 6–26 Lokomotive Moscow (2nd v 1st)
Kazan Arrows 18–17 Empire Penza (4th v 3rd)

Week Three

Matches played on 9 October.

Empire Penza 28–24 Kazan Arrows (3rd v 4th)

Table

References 
 http://rclm.ru/championat.html

See also

 Rugby league in Russia
 Russia national rugby league team

Rugby league in Russia
2007 in rugby league
2007 in Russian sport